Nebo is a home rule-class city in Hopkins County, Kentucky, in the United States. The population was 236 as of the 2010 census.

History
Nebo was established by pioneer and merchant Alfred Townes in 1840.  It was named for the Biblical Mount Nebo, where Moses viewed the Promised Land.  The city incorporated in 1861.

Geography
Nebo is located in northwestern Hopkins County at  (37.384425, -87.641429). U.S. Route 41A passes through the center of Nebo, leading east  to Madisonville, the county seat, and west  to Providence.

Demographics

As of the census of 2000, there were 220 people, 84 households, and 67 families residing in the city. The racial makeup of the city was 100.00% White.

There were 84 households, out of which 34.5% had children under the age of 18 living with them, 59.5% were married couples living together, 11.9% had a female householder with no husband present, and 20.2% were non-families. 19.0% of all households were made up of individuals, and 10.7% had someone living alone who was 65 years of age or older. The average household size was 2.62 and the average family size was 2.97.

In the city, the population was spread out, with 25.5% under the age of 18, 13.2% from 18 to 24, 26.4% from 25 to 44, 24.1% from 45 to 64, and 10.9% who were 65 years of age or older. The median age was 36 years. For every 100 females, there were 101.8 males. For every 100 females age 18 and over, there were 97.6 males.

The median income for a household in the city was $31,667, and the median income for a family was $36,250. Males had a median income of $26,458 versus $21,250 for females. The per capita income for the city was $16,117. None of the families and 3.9% of the population were living below the poverty line, including no under eighteens and 19.4% of those over 64.

Economy

The Western Kentucky Speedway, a dirt track, is located just southeast of Nebo on Happy Lane.

References

External links

Populated places established in 1840
Cities in Kentucky
Cities in Hopkins County, Kentucky